King Wen of Zhou (1152–1050 BC, the Cultured King) was Count of Zhou during the late Shang dynasty in ancient China. Although frequently confused with his fourth son Duke of Zhou, also known as "Lord Zhou", they are different historical persons. Although it was his son Wu who conquered the Shang following the Battle of Muye, Count Wen was posthumously honored as the founder of the Zhou dynasty and posthumously titled King. Many of the hymns of the Classic of Poetry are praises to the legacy of King Wen. Some consider him the first epic hero of Chinese history.

Archaeology
Chinese scholars (e.g. Wang Yunwu (王雲五), Li Xueqin (李学勤), etc.) identified King Wen with a  mentioned in inscriptions H11:82 & H11:84 among oracle bones excavated at Zhouyuan, Qishan County.

Biography

Born Ji Chang, Wen was the son of Tairen and Ji Jili, the Count of Zhou, a vassal state of the Kingdom of Shang along the Wei River in present-day Shaanxi. Jili was betrayed and executed by the Shang king Wen Ding in the late 12th century BC, leaving the young Chang as the Count of Zhou.

Wen married Taisi and fathered ten sons and one daughter by her, plus at least another eight sons with concubines.

At one point, King Zhou of Shang, fearing Wen's growing power, imprisoned him in Youli (present-day Tangyin in Henan) after he was slandered by the Marquis of Chong. His eldest son, Bo Yikao, went to King Zhou to plead for his freedom, but was executed in a rage by lingchi and made into meat cakes which were fed to his father in Youli. However, many officials (in particular San Yisheng and Hong Yao) respected Wen for his honorable governance and gave King Zhou so many gifts  including gold, horses, and women  that he released Wen, and also bestowed upon him his personal weapons and invested him with the special rank of Count of the West (Western Shang). Wen offered a piece of his land in Western Luo to King Zhou, who in turn allowed Wen to make one last request. He requested that the Burning Pillar punishment be abolished, and so it was.

Subsequently, upon returning home Wen secretly began to plot to overthrow King Zhou. In his first year as Count of the West, he settled a land dispute between the states of Yu and Rui, earning greater recognition among the nobles. It is by this point that some nobles began calling him "king". The following year, Wen found Jiang Ziya fishing in the Pan River and hired him as a military counselor. He also repelled an invasion of the Quanrong barbarians and occupied a portion of their land. The following year, he campaigned against Mixu, a state whose chief had been harassing the smaller states of Ruan and Gong, thus annexing the three of them. The following year, he attacked Li, a puppet of Shang, and the next year he attacked E, a rebel state opposed to Shang, conquering both. One year later he attacked Chong, home of Hu, Marquis of Chong, his arch-enemy, and defeated it, gaining access to the Ford of Meng through which he could cross his army to attack Shang. By then he had obtained about two thirds of the whole kingdom either as direct possessions or sworn allies. That same year he moved his capital city one hundred kilometers east from Mount Qi to Feng, placing the Shang under imminent threat. The following year, however, the Count of the West died before he could cross the Ford. It is worth-noting, nonetheless, that other sources suggest he died in battle during the Zhou campaign against the Yin-Shang.

Four years after his death, his second son, known as King Wu, followed his footsteps and crushed the Shang at Muye, founding the Zhou dynasty. The name "Wen" means "the Cultured" or "the Civilizing" and was made into an official royal name by King Wu in honor of his father.

Legacy

Divination

Many of the older odes from the Classic of Poetry (Shijing 詩經) are hymns in praise of King Wen. King Wen is also credited with having stacked the eight trigrams in their various permutations to create the sixty-four hexagrams of the I Ching. He is also said to have written the judgments which are appended to each hexagram. The most commonly used sequence of the 64 hexagrams is attributed to him and is usually referred to as the King Wen sequence.

Posthumous honors
In 196 BC, Han Gaozu gave King Wen the title "Greatest of All Kings".

Family
Wives:
 Tai Si, of the Youshen lineage of the Si clan
Concubines:
 Lady, of the Zi clan of Shang, a daughter of Wen Ding and a younger sister of Di Yi
 Other spouses.

Sons:
 By Tai Si:
 First son: Bo Yikao;
 Second son: Fa; ruled as King Wu of Zhou;
 Third son: Xian, ruled Guan;
 Fourth son: Dan,
 Served as Grand Tutor  and regent for King Cheng of Zhou;
 Dan's son Boqin ruled as Duke of Lu;  
 Fifth son: Du, ruled Cai;
 Sixth son: Zhenduo, ruled Cao;
 Seventh son: Wu, ruled Cheng;
 Eight son: Chu, ruled Huo;
 Ninth son: Feng, ruled Kang then Wey;
 Tenth son: Zai, ruled Ran or Dan.
By other spouses:
 Ruler of Gao ;
 Count of Yong ;
 Zheng, Duke of Mao ;
 Xiu, ruler of Teng;
 Gao , ruled as Duke of Bi ;
 Count of Yuan 
 Marquis of Feng 
 Count of Xun 
 Shi , Count / Duke of Shao  and ruler of Yan
 Served as Grand Protector to King Cheng

 Yuanhe Xingzuan "Register of surnames of the Yuanhe reign" lists King Wen's sons in a slightly different order of birth:
 Eldest son: Bo Yikao (伯邑考)
 Second son: Fa, King Wu of Zhou (周武王)
 Third son: Xian, Ruler of Guan (管叔鮮)
 Fourth son: Dan, Duke of Zhou (周公旦)
 Fifth son: Du, Ruler of Cai (蔡叔度)
 Sixth son: Chu, Ruler of Huo (霍叔處) 
 Seventh son: Wu, Ruler of Cheng (郕叔武)
 Eight son: Feng, Ruler of Kang then Wey ([衛]康叔封)
 Ninth son: Zheng, Ruler of Mao (毛叔鄭)
 Tenth son: Zai, Ruler of Ran (冉季載)
 Eleventh son: Ruler of Gao (郜叔)
 Twelfth son: Count of Yong (雍伯)
 Thirteenth son: Zhenduo, Ruler of Cao (曹叔振鐸)
 Fourteenth son: Xiu, Marquis of Teng (滕侯 / 滕叔繡)
 Fifteenth son: Gao, Duke of Bi (畢公高)
 Sixteenth son: Count of Yuan (原伯)
 Seventeenth son: Marquis of Feng (豐侯)
 Eighteenth son: Count of Xun (郇伯)

Ancestry

See also
Family tree of ancient Chinese emperors

Notes

References

Further reading

Ci Hai Bian Ji Wei Yuan Hui. Shanghai Ci Shu Chu Ban She (Shanghai), 1979  
Wu, K. C. The Chinese Heritage. Crown Publishers (New York), 1982. .

1152 BC births
11th-century BC Chinese monarchs
Guqin players
Shang dynasty musicians
Zhou dynasty kings
Investiture of the Gods characters
Shang dynasty politicians
Deified Chinese people